George William Knox, D.D., LL.D. (1853 – April 25, 1912) was an American Presbyterian theologian and writer, born at Rome, New York.  He graduated from Hamilton College in 1874, and from Auburn Theological Seminary in 1877, after which he went as a missionary to Japan, where he was professor of homiletics in Tokyo and professor of philosophy and ethics at the Imperial University of Tokyo.

Following his return to the United States, he was pastor at Rye, New York.  In 1897–1899 he lectured at Union Theological Seminary.

Works
He published in Japanese:
A Brief System of Theology
Outlines of Homiletics
The Basis of Ethics
The Mystery of Life;

and in English:
A Japanese Philosopher (1893)
The Christian Point of View, with Francis Brown and A. C. McGiffert (1902)
The Direct and Fundamental Proofs of the Christian Religion (1903, 1908)
Japanese Life in Town and Country (1904)
Imperial Japan (1905)
The Spirit of the Orient (1906)
The Development of Religion in Japan (1907)
The Gospel of Jesus (1909)

References

External links

1853 births
1912 deaths
American theologians
American non-fiction writers
American Presbyterians
Hamilton College (New York) alumni
People from Rome, New York
Auburn Theological Seminary alumni